Robinsonekspedisjonen: 2003, was the fifth season of the Norwegian version of the Swedish show Expedition Robinson, and it premiered on 7 September 2003 and aired until 7 December 2003. The fifth season took place on an island in Malaysia. In the fifth season the number of contestants was lowered from eighteen to sixteen. A highlight from the first half of the season was the losing streak of the South team. In episode five there was a tribal swap in which both Mia and Marianne swapped tribes and each became the new chief of their new tribe. When the tribes merged, the members of the original South team tried hard to get members of the original North team to swap, but this was to no avail. In episode nine the contestants were randomly paired up and competed in a challenge for immunity. The pair that finished last in the challenge, Joachim and Vera, lost their voting rights. As a twist in episode nine, when one member of a pair was voted out the other was automatically eliminated as well which meant since Joachim was voted out, Vera was too. Following the double elimination, Joachim and Vera competed in a duel to see which of them would return to the game, Joachim won the duel. Upon Joachim's return he was furious with his fellow former alliance members Eva, Espen, and Gunnar who along with Vera made up a five-person alliance before Joachim was voted out. Shortly after his return Joachim was voted. Following Joachim's elimination, the original North team members eliminated Marit, the last original South team member. Ultimately, it was Emil Orderud who won the season over Eva Worren by an unknown jury vote.

Finishing order

References

 2003
2003 Norwegian television seasons